Baldichieri d'Asti is a comune (municipality) in the Province of Asti in the Italian region Piedmont, located about  southeast of Turin and about  west of Asti.

Baldichieri d'Asti borders the following municipalities: Asti, Castellero, Monale, Tigliole, and Villafranca d'Asti.

Demographic evolution

References

External links
 www.comune.baldichieridasti.at.it/

Cities and towns in Piedmont